Allan Sayre (born November 12, 1969) is a former member from the 96th district of the Ohio House of Representatives, which covers Dover. He was also the Assistant Majority Whip.

External links
 Biography

Members of the Ohio House of Representatives
Living people
1969 births
21st-century American politicians